Events from the year 1949 in the United States.

Incumbents

Federal Government 
 President: Harry S. Truman (D-Missouri)
 Vice President: vacant (until January 20), Alben W. Barkley (D-Kentucky) (starting January 20)
 Chief Justice: Fred M. Vinson (Kentucky)
 Speaker of the House of Representatives: Joseph William Martin, Jr. (R-Massachusetts) (until January 3), Sam Rayburn (D-Texas) (starting January 3)
 Senate Majority Leader: Wallace H. White, Jr. (R-Maine) (until January 3), Scott W. Lucas (D-Illinois) (starting January 3)
 Congress: 80th (until January 3), 81st (starting January 3)

Events

January–March

 January 2 – Luis Muñoz Marín becomes the first democratically elected Governor of Puerto Rico.
 January 4 – RMS Caronia (1947) of the Cunard Line departs Southampton for New York City on her maiden voyage.
 January 4–February 22 – Series of winter storms in Nebraska, Wyoming, South Dakota, Utah, Colorado and Nevada – winds of up to 72 mph – tens of thousands of cattle and sheep perish.
 January 5 – President Harry S. Truman unveils his Fair Deal program.
 January 11 – Los Angeles, California, receives its first recorded snowfall.
 January 17 – The first Volkswagen Beetle to arrive in the United States, a 1948 model, is brought to New York City by Dutch businessman Ben Pon. Unable to interest dealers or importers in the Volkswagen, Pon sells the sample car to pay his travel expenses. Only two 1949 models will be sold in America that year, convincing Volkswagen chairman Heinrich Nordhoff that the car has no future in the U.S. (The VW Beetle goes on to become the greatest automobile phenomenon in American history.)
 January 19 – The Poe Toaster first appears at the grave of Edgar Allan Poe.
 January 20 – President Harry S. Truman begins his full term. Alben W. Barkley is sworn in as Vice President of the United States.
 January 25 – The first Emmy Awards are presented at the Hollywood Athletic Club.
 February 10 – Arthur Miller's tragedy Death of a Salesman opens at the Morosco Theatre on Broadway in New York City with Lee J. Cobb in the title rôle of Willy Loman and runs for 742 performances.
 February 19 – Ezra Pound is awarded the first Bollingen Prize in poetry by the Bollingen Foundation and Yale University.
 February 22 – Grady the Cow, a 1,200-pound cow, gets stuck inside a silo on a farm in Yukon, Oklahoma and garners national media attention.
 March 2 – The B-50 Superfortress Lucky Lady II under Captain James Gallagher lands in Fort Worth, Texas, after completing the first non-stop around-the-world airplane flight (it was refueled in flight 4 times).
 March 17 – The Shamrock Hotel in Houston, Texas, owned by oil tycoon Glenn McCarthy, has its grand opening.
 March 20 – The Chicago, Burlington & Quincy, Denver & Rio Grande Western and Western Pacific railroads inaugurate the California Zephyr passenger train between Chicago and Oakland, California, as the first long-distance train to feature Vista Dome cars as regular equipment.
 March 24 – The 21st Academy Awards ceremony, hosted by Robert Montgomery, is held at the Academy Theater in Hollywood, Los Angeles. Laurence Olivier's Hamlet wins the most awards with four, including Best Picture, while John Huston wins Best Director for The Treasure of the Sierra Madre. Jean Negulesco's Johnny Belinda receives the most nominations with 12.
 March 26 – The first half of Giuseppe Verdi's opera Aida, conducted by conductor Arturo Toscanini, and performed in concert (i.e. no scenery or costumes), is telecast by NBC, live from Studio 8H at Rockefeller Center. The second half is telecast a week later. This is the only complete opera that Toscanini ever conducts on television.
 March 28 – United States Secretary of Defense James Forrestal resigns suddenly.

April–June

 April 4 – The North Atlantic Treaty is signed in Washington, D.C., creating the NATO defense alliance.
 April 7 – Rodgers and Hammerstein's South Pacific, starring Mary Martin and Ezio Pinza, opens on Broadway and goes on to become R&H's second longest-running musical. It becomes an instant classic of the musical theatre. The score's biggest hit is the song Some Enchanted Evening.
 April 13 – The 6.7  Olympia earthquake affected the Puget Sound region of western Washington with a maximum Mercalli intensity of VIII (Severe), causing eight deaths and $25 million in damage.
 April 23 – Development of the USS United States (CVA-58) "supercarrier" is cancelled; high-ranking Navy officials resign in protest in what has been called the Revolt of the Admirals.
 May 1 Albert Einstein publishes Why Socialism? in the first edition of the Monthly Review.
 May ? – A working group has been set up by United States Department of State, to codify the White Paper. This team consists of more than 80 staff members, led by Secretary of State Dean Acheson, former Columbia University Professor of Public International Law Philip C. Jessup.
 June 8 – Red Scare: Celebrities including Helen Keller, Dorothy Parker, Danny Kaye, Fredric March, John Garfield, Paul Muni and Edward G. Robinson are named in an FBI report as Communist Party members.
 June 14 – Albert II, a rhesus monkey, becomes the first primate to enter space, on Hermes project V-2 rocket Blossom IVB, but is killed on impact at return.
 June 19 – Glenn Dunaway wins the inaugural NASCAR race at Charlotte Speedway, a 3/4 mile oval in Charlotte, North Carolina, but is disqualified due to illegal springs. Jim Roper is declared the official winner.
 June 24 – The first television western, Hopalong Cassidy, airs on NBC.
 June 29 – The last U.S. troops withdraw from South Korea.

July–September

 August 5 – United States Department of State published The China White Paper as Department of State Publication 3573, entitled "United States Relations With China, With Special Reference to the Period 1944–1949."
 August 10 – The National Military Establishment (formerly the Department of War) is renamed the Department of Defense.
 August 16 – Office of Chairman of the Joint Chiefs of Staff created.
 August 28 – The last 6 surviving veterans of the American Civil War meet in Indianapolis.
 September 5 – Howard Unruh, a World War II veteran, kills 13 neighbors in Camden, New Jersey with a souvenir Luger to become America's first single-episode mass murderer.
 September 15 – The Housing Act of 1949 is enacted.
 September 29 – Iva Toguri D'Aquino is found guilty of broadcasting for Japan as "Tokyo Rose" during World War II.

October–December

 October 5 – Walt Disney Productions' eleventh feature film, The Adventures of Ichabod and Mr. Toad, is released. It is Disney's final package film to be released during the 1940s and the last the studio would produce until 1977's The Many Adventures of Winnie the Pooh.
 October 9 - The New York Yankees defeat the Brooklyn Dodgers, 4 games to 1, to win their 12th World Series Title.
 October 27 – An airliner flying from Paris to New York City crashes in the Azores island of São Miguel. Among the victims are violinist Ginette Neveu and boxer Marcel Cerdan.
 November – Englewood race riot in Chicago.
 November 24 – The ski resort in Squaw Valley, California officially opens.

Undated
 General Services Administration established per Federal Property and Administrative Services Act of 1949
 Myron Corp is founded in New Jersey.
 The first 20 mm M61 Vulcan Gatling gun prototypes are completed.
 1949 is the first year in which no African-American is lynched in the USA.
 Schepps Palm Field (1949–1959) baseball venue opens in Corpus Christi, Texas.

Ongoing
 Cold War (1947–1991)
 Second Red Scare (1947–1957)
 Marshall Plan (1948–1951)

Births
 January 2
 Christopher Durang, playwright
 Iris Marion Young, political scientist (died 2006)
 January 6 – Carolyn D. Wright, poet (died 2016)
 January 8 – John Podesta, lawyer and politician, 20th White House Chief of Staff
 January 10
 George Foreman, heavyweight boxer
 James Lapine, director and playwright
 Linda Lovelace, pornographic film actress (died 2002)
 January 11 – Chris Ford, basketball player and coach (died 2023)
 January 17 – Chavo Guerrero Sr., professional wrestler (died 2017)
 January 22 – Steve Perry, musician
 February 2 – Brent Spiner, actor, comedian and singer
 February 4 – Michael Beck, actor
 February 7 – Joe English, drummer and songwriter 
 February 15 – Ken Anderson, American football player and coach
 February 17 – Dennis Green, American football player and coach (died 2016)
 February 19 – Danielle Bunten Berry, born Dan(iel Paul) Bunten, software developer (died 1998)
 February 25
 Ric Flair (Richard Fliehr), wrestler
 Sherman Packard, speaker of the New Hampshire House of Representatives
 February 27 – John Wockenfuss, baseball player (died 2022)
 February 28 – Ilene Graff, actress and singer
 March 2
 Gates McFadden, actress and choreographer
 March 3 
 Gloria Hendry, African American actress
 Jesse Jefferson, baseball player (died 2011)
 Sandy Martin, actress
 March 10 – Larry Wall, computer programmer
 March 12 – Rob Cohen, film director
 March 13 – Julia Migenes, soprano
 March 16
 Erik Estrada, television actor and police officer
 Elliott Murphy, singer-songwriter
 March 17 – Patrick Duffy, television actor
 March 21 – Eddie Money (Edward Mahoney), rock guitarist and singer (died 2019)
 March 28 – Michael W. Young, geneticist and chronobiologist, recipient of the Nobel Prize in Physiology or Medicine in 2017
 March 29 – Michael Brecker, jazz saxophonist (died 2007)
 April 1 – Gil Scott-Heron, African American poet, jazz/soul musician and author (died 2011)
 April 5 – Judith Resnik, astronaut (died 1986)
 April 7 – Mitch Daniels, Academic Administrator, businessman, author, politician and the 49th governor of Indiana
 April 9 – Stephen Hickman, illustrator
 April 11 – Dorothy Allison, novelist and campaigner
 April 20 – Jessica Lange, actress
 May 1
 Gavin Christopher, singer (died 2016)
 Sarah Clayborne, pie chef, restaurateur, and community activist
 May 3 – Ron Wyden, U.S. Senator from Oregon from 1996
 May 4 
 John Force, race car driver
 Gary Gaines, American football coach (died 2022)
 May 7 – Deborah Butterfield, sculptor
 May 9 – Billy Joel, singer-songwriter and pianist
 May 13 – Zoë Wanamaker, actress
 May 15 – George Adams, basketball player
 May 22 – Jesse Lee Peterson, conservative broadcaster
 May 26 – Ward Cunningham, computer programmer
 June 3 – John Rothman, actor
 June 7 – Larry Hama, comic book writer, artist, actor and musician
 June 14 – Harry Turtledove, novelist
 June 20 – Lionel Richie, African American singer-songwriter
 June 22
 Larry Junstrom, rock bassist (died 2019)
 Alan Osmond, pop singer
 Meryl Streep, actress
 Elizabeth Warren, U.S. Senator from Massachusetts from 2013
 July 1 – Denis Johnson, writer
 July 15 – Richard Russo, novelist
 July 16 – Alan Fitzgerald, guitarist and keyboardist 
 July 19 – Calvin O. Butts, academic administrator and pastor (died 2022)
 July 24 – Michael Richards, actor and comedian
 July 29 – Marilyn Quayle, wife of Dan Quayle, Second Lady of the United States
 July 31 – Mike Jackson, basketball player
 August 1 – Jim Carroll, author, poet and punk musician (died 2009)
 August 3 – Peter Gutmann, journalist
 August 4 – John Riggins, American football player
 August 6
 Richard Prince, painter and photographer
 Clarence Richard Silva, bishop 
 August 11 – Tim Hutchinson, U.S. Senator from Arkansas from 1997 to 2003
 August 13 – Pete Visclosky, politician
 August 14 – Bob Backlund, pro wrestler
 August 15
 Beverly Burns, pilot
 Mark B. Rosenberg, political scientist and academic
 August 17 – Norm Coleman, U.S. Senator from Minnesota from 2003 to 2009
 August 22 
Doug Bair, baseball player and coach
 Diana Nyad, swimmer and author
 August 24
 Stephen Paulus, composer and educator (died 2014)
 Charles Rocket, actor (died 2005)
 August 31
 Richard Gere, film actor
 H. David Politzer, physicist, recipient of the Nobel Prize in Physics in 2004
 September 1 – Leslie Feinberg, transgender activist
 September 7 - Lee McGeorge Durrell, zoologist
 September 10 – Bill O'Reilly, conservative political commentator
 September 13 – John W. Henry, foreign exchange advisor and Boston Red Sox owner
 September 15 – Joe Barton, politician
 September 16 – Ed Begley, Jr. actor and environmentalist
 September 23 – Bruce Springsteen, singer-songwriter
 September 26 – Jane Smiley, novelist
 September 27 – Mike Schmidt, baseball player and coach
 September 29 – Burton Richardson, game show announcer
 October 3 –  Haunani-Kay Trask, activist, educator and poet (died 2021)
 October 5
 Bill James, historian and author
 B. W. Stevenson, singer-songwriter and guitarist (died 1988)
 October 8 
 Jerry Bittle, cartoonist (died 2003)
 Ashawna Hailey, computer scientist and philanthropist (d. 2011)
 Mark Hopkinson, mass murderer and proxy killer (d. 1992)
 Sigourney Weaver (Susan Weaver), film actress
 October 15 – Tanya Roberts, actress (d. 2021)
 October 24
 Chester Marcol, American football player
 John Markoff, journalist and author
 Stan White, American football player and sportscaster
 October 25 – Ross Bagdasarian, Jr., film producer, record producer, singer and voice artist (son of Alvin and the Chipmunks creator Ross Bagdasarian, Sr.)
 October 30 – Dave Lebling, interactive game designer
 November 1 – Jeannie Berlin, film actress
 November 2 – Lois McMaster Bujold, author of speculative fiction
 November 8 – Bonnie Raitt, blues singer and guitarist
 November 9 –  Julie Beckett, teacher and disability rights activist (died 2022)
 November 10 
 Brad Ashford, politician (died 2022)
 Ann Reinking, actress, dancer and choreographer (died 2020)
 November 12 – Jack Reed, U.S. Senator from Rhode Island from 1997
 November 14 – James Young, hard rock singer-songwriter and guitarist (Styx)
 November 23 – Tom Joyner, radio host
 November 29
 Jerry Lawler, wrestler
 Garry Shandling, comedian (died 2016)
 December 4 – Jeff Bridges, film actor
 December 9 – Tom Kite, golfer
 December 13
 Randy Owen, country lead vocalist, rhythm guitar player
 Tom Verlaine, rock singer, guitarist (died 2023)
 December 14 – Bill Buckner, baseball player (died 2019)
 December 15 – Don Johnson, television actor
 December 16 – Billy Gibbons, rock guitarist (ZZ Top)
 December 20 
 Cecil Cooper, baseball player and manager
 Oscar Gamble, baseball player (died 2018)
 December 22 – Ray Guy, American football player (died 2022)
 December 25
 Sissy Spacek, film actress
 Joe Louis Walker, African American electric blues musician
 December 28 – Barbara De Fina, film producer

Deaths
 January 6 – Victor Fleming, film director (born 1889)
 January 11 – Nelson Doubleday, publisher (born 1889)
 January 14 – Harry Stack Sullivan, psychiatrist (born 1892)
 February 1 – Herbert Stothart, composer (born 1885)
 March 7
 Sol Bloom, politician and impresario (born 1870)
 Bradbury Robinson, footballer who threw the first forward pass in American football history in 1906 (born 1884)
 March 17 – Felix Bressart, German American actor (born 1892)
 March 20 – Irving Fazola, jazz clarinetist (born 1912; heart attack)
 March 25 – Jack Kapp, president of the U.S. branch of Decca Records (born 1901)
 April 6 – Joseph J. Sullivan, gambler (born 1870)
 April 15 – Wallace Beery, film actor (born 1885)
 April 22 – Charles Middleton, actor (born 1874)
 May 22 – James Forrestal, U.S. Secretary of Navy and Defense (born 1892)
 May 27 – Robert Ripley, creator of Ripley's Believe It or Not! (born 1890)
 June 14 – Russell Doubleday, author and publisher (born 1872)
 June 25 – Buck Freeman, baseball player (born 1871)
 July 7 – Bunk Johnson, African American jazz trumpeter (born 1879)
 July 18 – Alice Corbin Henderson, poet (born 1881)
 July 24 – Virginia M. Alexander, African American physician and community activist (born 1899)
 July 26 – Linda Arvidson, silent film actress (born 1884)
 July 27 – Ellery Harding Clark, field athlete (born 1874)
 August 9
 Gustavus M. Blech, German American physician and surgeon (born 1870)
 Harry Davenport, actor (born 1866)
 August 16 – Margaret Mitchell, novelist (born 1900; killed in road accident)
 August 18 – Paul Mares, dixieland jazz cornet player (born 1900; lung cancer)
 September 10 – Wiley Rutledge, U.S. Supreme Court Justice (born 1894)
 September 12 – Harry Burleigh, African American baritone and classical composer (born 1866)
 September 18 – Frank Morgan, character actor (born 1890)
 September 19 – Will Cuppy, humorist (born 1884)
 September 20 – Richard Dix, film actor (born 1893)
 September 22 – Sam Wood, film director (born 1883)
 September 27 – David Adler, architect (born 1882)
 October 1 – Buddy Clark, singer (born 1911; killed in aviation accident)
 October 14 – Fritz Leiber (Sr.), actor (born 1882)
 October 15 – Elmer Clifton, film actor and director (born 1890)
 October 23 – Almanzo Wilder, writer, husband of Laura Ingalls Wilder (born 1857)
 October 26 – Emil Liston, sports coach and administrator (born 1890)
 October 31 – Edward Stettinius, Jr., U.S. Secretary of State (born 1900; coronary thrombosis)
 November 2 – Jerome F. Donovan, politician (born 1872)
 November 3 – Solomon R. Guggenheim, philanthropist (born 1861)
 November 25 – Bill Robinson ("Bojangles"), African American dancer (born 1878)
 December 6
 Lead Belly (Huddie William Ledbetter), African American blues musician (born 1888)
 Mary Margaret O'Reilly, Assistant Director of the United States Mint (born 1865)
 December 7 – Rex Beach, adventure novelist and Olympic water polo player (born 1877)
 December 25 – Leon Schlesinger, film producer (born 1884)
 December 28
 Hervey Allen, novelist (born 1889)
 Ivie Anderson, African American jazz singer (born 1905; asthma)

See also
 List of American films of 1949
 Timeline of United States history (1930–1949)

References

External links
 

 
1940s in the United States
United States
United States
Years of the 20th century in the United States